Maurice Percy Hutton (21 March 1903 – 20 February 1940) was an Australian rules footballer who played with Sturt in the South Australian Football League (SAFL), and cricketer who played in two first-class matches for South Australia in the 1928/29 Sheffield Shield.

Hutton was born at Parkside, South Australia in 1903. His father Percy Hutton and brother Harvey Hutton also played cricket for South Australia, as did his cousin Mervyn Hutton. He died at Mitcham, South Australia in 1940 aged 36.

References

External links 		
 

1903 births
1940 deaths
Sturt Football Club players
Australian rules footballers from South Australia
Cricketers from South Australia
South Australia cricketers